Aitor García Flores (born 25 March 1994) is a Spanish footballer who plays for Sporting de Gijón as a winger.

Club career
Born in Gibraleón, Province of Huelva, García started playing as a senior with the reserve side in Tercera División, in 2011. On 28 January of the following year he made his debut with the Andalusians' first team, coming on as a substitute for Javi Álamo in the 79th minute of an away game against Real Murcia and scoring the last goal of the Segunda División match (3–0).

On 20 June 2012 García signed a new four-year contract with the Andalusians, and was loaned to Celta de Vigo B in January 2013, with the deal being renewed in July. On 14 August 2014 he rescinded his link with Recre, and joined Segunda División B's CD Toledo six days later.

On 25 January 2015, García signed a three-year deal with fellow league club UD Almería B. On 5 August he rescinded his contract, and moved to Mérida AD just hours later.

On 14 July 2016, after scoring a career-best six goals during the campaign, García signed a three-year contract with Cádiz CF in the second tier. On 20 July of the following year, he extended his contract until 2020.

On 6 August 2018, García was loaned to fellow second division side CF Rayo Majadahonda, for one year. The following 31 January, he moved to Sporting de Gijón in the same category, also in a temporary deal.

References

External links

1994 births
Living people
Sportspeople from the Province of Huelva
Spanish footballers
Footballers from Andalusia
Association football wingers
Segunda División players
Segunda División B players
Tercera División players
Atlético Onubense players
Recreativo de Huelva players
Celta de Vigo B players
CD Toledo players
UD Almería B players
Mérida AD players
Cádiz CF players
CF Rayo Majadahonda players
Sporting de Gijón players